Air guitar is mimed guitar play.

Air Guitar may also refer to:

 "Air Guitar" (McBusted song)
 "Air Guitar", single by Ben & Jason
 "Air Guitar", single by Towers of London from Blood, Sweat and Towers
 Guitar Rockstar, European brand name for a virtual air guitar marketed in Japan under the brand name "Air Guitar"
 "Air Guitar", episode of Balamory

See also
 Air Guitar Nation 2006 documentary about the first US Air Guitar Championships
 Air Guitar in Oulu